El Dhere is a town located in the Galguduud region of Galmudug state in central Somalia. It is to the south of Galmudug's state capital, Dusmareb.

Location
El Dhere is located 30 km to the south of Dusmareb, the administrative and state capital of the Galguduud region and Galmudug state, and 40 km to the north of Guriceel, the commercial capital of the Galgaduud region.

Demographics
As of 2019 the town has around 50,000 residents. As with most of Galmudug, it is primarily inhabited by Somalis from the Hiraab sub-clan of the Hawiye, particularly the Ayr sub-clan of Habar Gidir.

Education
There are two primary and secondary schools that provide education in the town along with many Quranic schools. There is one privately owned university that provides undergraduate degrees.

Transportation
Air transportation in El Dhere is served by the nearby Guriel Airport.

Hospitals
Several health centers exist in the town, with most of them being privately owned. There is only one public hospital.

References

Populated places in Galguduud
Populated places in Somalia
Galmudug